Priva auricoccea is a species of plant in the family Verbenaceae. It is endemic to Namibia.  Its natural habitat is subtropical or tropical dry shrubland. It is threatened by habitat loss.

References

auricoccea
Endemic flora of Namibia
Data deficient plants
Taxonomy articles created by Polbot